Lasówka  is a village in the administrative district of Gmina Bystrzyca Kłodzka, within Kłodzko County, Lower Silesian Voivodeship, in south-western Poland. Between 1742/48–1945 it was part of Prussia and subsequently Germany.

The village has a population of 100.

References

Villages in Kłodzko County